The  St. Michael the Archangel Cathedral, also called Piura Cathedral, is a religious building affiliated to the Catholic Church that is located in the city of Piura, Peru.

It is located specifically between the Huancavelica and Tacna streets , in the place of arms of Piura. It was built in 1588. It was declared a Colonial Historical Monument by local authorities.

It is a temple with Neo-Renaissance elements that follows the Roman or Latin rite and is the mother church of the metropolitan Archdiocese of Piura (Archidioecesis Piurensis) that was created as a diocese in 1940 through the bull "Ad christianae plebis" of Pope Pius XII and Was elevated to its present status in 1966 by Pope Paul VI.

It is under the pastoral responsibility of Archbishop José Antonio Eguren Anselmi.

See also
Roman Catholicism in Peru
St. Michael the Archangel

References

Roman Catholic cathedrals in Peru
Roman Catholic churches completed in 1588
Basilica churches in Peru
16th-century Roman Catholic church buildings in Peru